Adimakal is a 1969 Indian Malayalam-language film, directed by K. S. Sethumadhavan and produced by M. O. Joseph. The film stars Prem Nazir, Sathyan, Sheela and Sharada. The film had musical score and songs composed by G. Devarajan. It won the National Film Award for Best Feature Film in Malayalam. The film is based on the novel of the same name by Pamman. The film was remade in Hindi as Intezar (1973) in Telugu as Chilakamma Cheppindi (1977) and in Tamil as Nizhal Nijamagiradhu (1978).

Plot

Ponnama (Sharada) is a pretty young girl who goes to work as a live-in maid with a family consisting of a brother, Ananthan (Jessy), and a sister, Saraswathyamma (Sheela). Saraswathyamma is very religious and spends most of her time in prayers and rituals. Also working in the house is Raghavan, a.k.a Pottan (Prem Nazir), so called, because he cannot hear properly. Potten loves Ponnamma, but she treats him like a friend. Ponnamma and Ananthan get close, and Ponnamma becomes pregnant. Ananthan refuses to accept the baby as his and asks her to not reveal that he is the father. Ponnamma doesn't tell anyone who the father of her child is. The only person she trusts is Appukuttan (Sathyan), a bank employee who likes Saraswathyamma. Saraswathyamma likes Appukuttan but religiosity comes in the way of accepting his love and she rebuffs his affections.

Saraswathyamma sends Ponnamma to live with Raghavan as she cannot keep an unmarried pregnant girl in the house due to societal pressures. Ponamma delivers a baby girl. Raghavan treats the baby as his own child, but Ponnamma still has no romantic feelings toward him. Ponnama's mother disowns her when he hears of her pregnancy. Meanwhile, Saraswathyamma realizes the folly of blind devotion when she finds out the swami she was following was a lecherous man.

Appukuttan finally reveals to Saraswathiamma who is the birth father of the baby. Saraswathiamma, Appukuttan, and Ananthan go to Raghu's house to get Ponnamma back home to get married to Ananthan. But Ponnamma refuses. She has seen Raghavan's unconditional acceptance, and love and care for the baby. She feels he is her baby's deserved father. Everyone accepts her verdict, and Appukuttan prepares to leave town due to a job transfer. He is surprised to see a changed Saraswathiamma, who requests she goes with him to live as husband and wife.

Cast 

Prem Nazir as Raghavan a.k.a Raghu (Pottan)
Sathyan as Appukkuttan
Sheela as Saraswathyamma
Sharada as Ponnamma
Adoor Bhasi as Giridhara Yogi/Naanu Kurup
Ammini
Sankaradi as Shanku Ammavan
Jesey as Anandan
Adoor Bhavani as Karthiyayini
Baby Kumudam as Vilasini
Bahadoor as Bhargavan
Kumari Padmini as Meenakshi
Kuttan Pillai
N. Govindankutty as Pachu Kurup
Paravoor Bharathan as Unnithan

Soundtrack 
The music was composed by G. Devarajan and the lyrics were written by Vayalar Ramavarma and Jayadevar. The devotional number ‘Chethi mandaram thulasi...' (P. Susheela) was elevated to the status of a prayer song. ‘Thaazhampoo manamulla thanuppulla...' (A. M. Rajah) was another hit and one of the singer's best in the language. The other hits include ‘Manaseswari maappu tharoo...' (Raja), ‘Indumukhi ..... (P. Jayachandran), and the chorus ‘Narayanam bhaje...' led by P. Jayachandran. A few verses ‘Lalitha lavanga Latha…' from Jayadeva's ‘Geeta Govindam' rendered by P. Leela was also a hit.

Reception 
The Indian Express wrote, "With a little more care in scripting and editing, Manjila's Adimakal (Slaves) would have aptly ended there, but sometimes, even our best film-makers do not know when and where to stop. There are a few other irrelevant scenes which, if chopped off would help this Malayalam film gain in tempo and appeal."

Awards
Filmfare Award for Best Film - Malayalam won by M. O. Joseph (1969)

References

External links 
 

1969 films
1960s Malayalam-language films
Films based on Indian novels
Malayalam films remade in other languages
Films directed by K. S. Sethumadhavan
Films with screenplays by Thoppil Bhasi
Best Malayalam Feature Film National Film Award winners